Victor George Shearburn (28 October 1900 – 3 December 1975)  was an eminent Anglican clergyman in the middle third of the  20th century.He was educated at Felsted and Hertford College, Oxford. Ordained in 1924  he held curacies at All Souls, Clapton Park and St Barnabas, Pimlico before becoming a member of the Community of the Resurrection. In 1955 he became Bishop of Rangoon, a post he held for 11 years; retiring back to Mirfield, he served as an Assistant Bishop of Wakefield.

References

1900 births
People educated at Felsted School
Alumni of Hertford College, Oxford
20th-century Anglican bishops in Asia
Anglican bishops of Tinnevelly
Anglican bishops of Rangoon
1975 deaths